Edgar Itt (born 8 June 1967) is a retired West German athlete.  He competed at the 1988 Summer Olympics in the 4 × 400 m relay and individual 400 m hurdles; he won a bronze medal in the relay and finished eighth in the 400 m hurdles. Itt also won two European silver medals in the 4 × 400 m relay in 1986 and 1990.

Itt was born to an African father, whom he never met. He graduated in business administration from the University of Frankfurt. Since 2000 he works as a motivation coach with businesspeople. In 2012 he was also involved with the German Olympic team as a psychologist. In December 2013 he married the musician and actress Ariane Roth.

References

External links
Personal website

1967 births
Living people
West German male sprinters
West German male hurdlers
Athletes (track and field) at the 1988 Summer Olympics
Olympic athletes of West Germany
Olympic bronze medalists for West Germany
People from Gedern
Sportspeople from Darmstadt (region)
European Athletics Championships medalists
Medalists at the 1988 Summer Olympics
Olympic bronze medalists in athletics (track and field)
Universiade medalists in athletics (track and field)
World Athletics Championships athletes for West Germany
Universiade bronze medalists for West Germany
Medalists at the 1989 Summer Universiade
20th-century German people